Ryan Hoggan (born 19 June 1998) is a Scottish footballer who plays as a defender or midfielder.

Career
Hoggan spent his youth career with Rangers and Heart of Midlothian before signing for Alloa Athletic. He made his debut for the club in August 2015 against Elgin City and played his first match in the Scottish Championship in a defeat to Rangers. Hoggan was released by Alloa in May 2018.

Career statistics

References

External links
 
 

1998 births
Living people
Scottish footballers
Association football defenders
Association football midfielders
Alloa Athletic F.C. players
Scottish Professional Football League players